The Chacao Channel bridge, also known as Chiloé Bicentennial Bridge, is a bridge currently under construction to link the island of Chiloé with mainland Chile crossing the Chacao Channel. It was one of the several projects that were planned to commemorate Chile's bicentennial in 2010. If completed as a suspension bridge, it would be the largest such bridge in South America. The opening of the bridge is planned for 2025.

History

Construction of the bridge was scheduled to start in the second half of 2007 and completion was due in late 2012 at an approximate cost of US$410 million. However, on 31 July 2006, the consortium in charge of the project revealed that the total cost of constructing the bridge was US$930 million, which was above the limit of US$607 million imposed by the government. In response, the ministry of Public Works decided not to continue with the project. To compensate the people of Chiloé for not building the bridge, then President Michelle Bachelet promised an upgrade to the island's infrastructure.

In June 2009, the Minister of Public Works announced it would revive the project. The bridge would be redesigned (it would no longer be a suspension bridge) and its total cost would be less than in the original design, due to the falling price of steel worldwide. The toll would be also cheaper than a ferry ticket.

In May 2012, President Sebastián Piñera again revived the project, announcing it would open an international bidding process to present the best solution for the construction of the bridge, with a US$740 million investment limit.

Dimensions and features

The Chacao Channel bridge would replace the ferry that connects the village of Chacao, Ancud Comuna, on Route 5 (Ruta 5 Sur) at the northern end of Chiloé Island across the Chacao Channel with the village of Pargua, Calbuco Comuna, on the mainland.

The original design for the bridge showed a total length of 2,635 m, consisting of three concrete towers (two 179.6 m high towers and one 160.77 m high south tower), two mainspans of 1,055 m and 1,100 m, and a suspended side span of 380 m, providing a minimum vertical clearance for navigation of 59 m. It was designed with two one-way lanes on each side. The bridge was designed for a lifespan of 100 years, resistant to winds over 240 km/h, and strong sea currents.

Design and construction

Design, financing, construction, operation and maintenance was originally awarded for thirty years to the Chiloé Bicentennial Bridge Consortium, consisting of French company Vinci Construction Grand Projets, German company Hochtief, American Bridge Company and Chilean companies Besalco and Tecsa. Hochtief was the overall leader, Vinci provided the technical lead, and American Bridge was to contribute cable spinning and deck erection technology.

In the revived 2012 process the contract was awarded to a consortium of the OAS, Hyundai, SYSTRA, and Aas-Jakobsen with financial backing from Brazilian, French and Norwegian investors.

Criticism

Supporters expected that the bridge would boost tourism, increase investment and business opportunities on the island and provide better access to medical care. However, some inhabitants of Chiloé did not agree and they claimed that the bridge was harmful and even dangerous. This was due to claims that it would increase resource collection such as logging and increase pollution.

References

American Bridge Co.
La Nación, December 23, 2004 (in Spanish) (Ed. note: The bridge depicted in this article is incorrect.)
El Mercurio, July 15, 2005 (in Spanish)
El Mercurio, January 14, 2006 (in Spanish)

Proposed bridges in South America
Transport in Los Lagos Region
Buildings and structures in Los Lagos Region
Buildings and structures in Chiloé Archipelago
Coasts of Los Lagos Region